River Des Peres Park is a municipal park in St. Louis that opened in 1934. River Des Peres Park is located near River Des Peres and the St. Louis City/County border line. The parks borders are Lansdowne Avenue, Morganford Avenue, and River Des Peres Boulevard. It is located near the neighborhoods of St. Louis Hills, Lindenwood Park, and Princeton Heights.

See also
People and culture of St. Louis, Missouri
Neighborhoods of St. Louis
Parks in St. Louis, Missouri

External links
Parks of St. Louis - St. Louis Parks Department website

Parks in St. Louis
Culture of St. Louis
Tourist attractions in St. Louis
1934 establishments in Missouri